Dion Marquise Hayes (born November 25, 1994), known professionally as 42 Dugg, is an American rapper from Detroit, Michigan. He is jointly signed to rappers Lil Baby and Yo Gotti's respective labels 4 Pockets Full (4PF) and Collective Music Group (CMG), in conjunction with Interscope Records. He is a fan of the Detroit Lions, stating in his song "We Paid" with rapper Lil Baby that he's "rocking with the Lions". He is known for his collaborations with Lil Baby, including "Grace" and "We Paid", the latter becoming his first top 10 on the Billboard Hot 100. His second mixtape Young & Turnt 2 (2020) garnered acclaim and marked his debut on the Billboard 200. His fourth mixtape, Free Dem Boyz, was released in 2021, peaking at number 8 on the  Billboard 200.

Early life 
Dion Hayes was born on November 25, 1994, and raised in the Denby neighborhood on Whittier Ave & Wayburn St on the east side of Detroit, Michigan . He attended Denby High School in Detroit, Michigan, but later dropped out.  The numbers "42" in Dugg's name is a numerical reference to a local Crips LC set known as the Hustle Boys.  He met fellow rapper Lil Baby in 2017. He grew up listening to Yo Gotti and Jeezy.
42 Dugg is 5 foot 2 inches.

Career 
Hayes first gained traction for tracks "The Streets" and "STFU". After writing slam poetry with Lil Baby, he signed to Lil Baby's 4 Pockets Full (4PF) and Yo Gotti's Collective Music Group (CMG), in conjunction with Interscope Records. 42 Dugg received national attention when he was featured on Lil Baby's February 2020 track "Grace", peaking at number 48 on the Billboard Hot 100. He was also featured on Lil Baby's track "We Paid" in May 2020, peaking at number 10 on the Billboard Hot 100. This boosted sales of his mixtape Young & Turnt 2, peaking at number 58 on the Billboard 200 and number six on Billboards Independent Albums chart. Hayes followed this success by doing guest features on songs for other artists such as Marshmello, Lil Keed, Meek Mill, Blac Youngsta, Big Sean, T.I., Kaash Paige, Tory Lanez and Latto.

On February 21, 2021, a shooting occurred at Roddy Ricch and 42 Dugg's music video shoot, which left three people injured in Atlanta. OMB Peezy was later charged with the shooting with aggravated assault with a deadly weapon and possession of a firearm during the commission of a crime. All three injured survived.

In May 2021, Billboard named 42 Dugg the "R&B/Hip-Hop Rookie of the Month". That same week, on May 21, 2021, Dugg released the 19-track mixtape, titled Free Dem Boyz, a dedication to all of his incarcerated friends. The project features the "standout" single, "4 da Gang" featuring Roddy Ricch; as well as other guest features from Lil Durk, Rowdy Rebel, and Fivio Foreign. Also in 2021, he was featured on the annual XXL Freshman Class.

Musical style 
42 Dugg usually employs a slurred vocal style with auto-tune into his music. His whistle has been noted as his signature sound that also kicks off nearly every song on his 2020 mixtape Young and Turnt Vol 2.

Legal issues 
At age 15 Hayes was arrested and sentenced to 4 years in prison for carjacking, though a fight with an inmate while incarcerated extended his prison time to a total of 6 years. He spent a month in solitary confinement on two occasions. During these times he practiced his lyric writing and he was released at age 22.

In 2019, Hayes was seen firing a gun in an Atlanta gun range, which he was prohibited from doing due to a prior felony conviction. He was sentenced to three years of probation and ordered to pay a $90,000 fine. On June 5, 2020, Hayes fled from a traffic stop in a rented SUV after running through a stop sign and spent two months as a fugitive. Authorities worked with the rental company to try to catch Hayes. Police captured Hayes on August 4, 2020, and charged him with a third-degree felony for fleeing from police. He was released on a $20,000 bond. Having violated the terms of his release for the gun range incident, he was sentenced to six months in a federal prison camp.

On May 5, 2022, Hayes was arrested in Ypsilanti, Michigan at Willow Run Airport after failing to report to serve his prison sentence. In April of the same year, he tried to avoid incarceration by filing a court document in which he claimed to be a sovereign citizen immune from federal laws.

Discography

Compilation albums

Mixtapes

Extended plays

Singles

As lead artist

As featured artist

Other charted songs

Guest appearances

Notes

References 

Living people
1994 births
Interscope Records artists
Rappers from Detroit
21st-century American rappers
African-American male rappers
Songwriters from Michigan
Gangsta rappers
African-American male songwriters
Midwest hip hop musicians